Bis(triphenylphosphine)iminium chloride is the chemical compound with the formula , often abbreviated , where Ph is phenyl , or even abbreviated [PPN]Cl or [PNP]Cl or PPNCl or PNPCl, where PPN or PNP stands for . This colorless salt is a source of the  cation (abbreviated  or ), which is used as an unreactive and weakly coordinating cation to isolate reactive anions.  is a phosphazene.

Synthesis and structure
 is prepared in two steps from triphenylphosphine :

This triphenylphosphine dichloride  is related to phosphorus pentachloride .

Triphenylphosphine oxide  is a by-product.

The P=N=P angle in the cation is flexible, ranging from ~130 to 180° depending on the salt. Bent and linear forms of the P=N=P connections have been observed in the same unit cell. The same shallow potential well for bending is observed in the isoelectronic species bis(triphenylphosphoranylidene)methane, as well as the more distantly related molecule carbon suboxide, . For the solvent-free chloride salt , the P=N=P bond angle was determined to be 133°. The two P=N bonds are equivalent, and their length is 1.597(2) Å.

Use as reagent
In the laboratory,  is the main precursor to  salts. Using salt metathesis reactions, nitrite, azide, and other small inorganic anions can be obtained with  cations.

 forms crystalline salts with a range of anions that are otherwise difficult to crystallize. Its effectiveness is partially attributable to its rigidity, reflecting the presence of six phenyl rings. Often  forms salts that are more air-stable than salts with smaller cations such as those containing quaternary ammonium cation , or alkali metal cations. This effect is attributed to the steric shielding provided by this voluminous cation.

Related cations

References 

Organophosphorus compounds
Chlorides
Phosphazenes
Phenyl compounds